Pāvels Tulubjevs (born July 2, 1985) is a Latvian bobsledder who has competed since 2007.

He finished 11th in the four-man event at the 2010 Winter Olympics in Vancouver.

References

External links

1985 births
Bobsledders at the 2010 Winter Olympics
Latvian male bobsledders
Living people
Olympic bobsledders of Latvia
Place of birth missing (living people)
21st-century Latvian people